Eyðgerð Rúnadóttir Mikkelsen (born 20 February 2001) is a Faroese footballer who plays as a goalkeeper for 1. deild kvinnur club Havnar Bóltfelag and the Faroe Islands women's national team.

References

2001 births
Living people
Faroese women's footballers
Women's association football goalkeepers
Faroe Islands women's youth international footballers
Faroe Islands women's international footballers
Havnar Bóltfelag players